Hon. Charles Lawrence Dundas (18 July 1771 – 25 January 1810) was a British politician and Whig Member of Parliament in the House of Commons. He represented Malton  from 1798–1805 and Richmond from 1806 to his death.

Early life and education
Dundas was born in St George Hanover Square, London, the third son of Thomas Dundas and Lady Charlotte Fitzwilliam. His grandfathers were Sir Lawrence Dundas, 1st Baronet and William Fitzwilliam, 3rd Earl Fitzwilliam. His father succeeded to the baronetcy in 1781 and in 1794 was raised to the peerage as Baron Dundas. His eldest brother was Lawrence Dundas, 1st Earl of Zetland (1766–1839), and Rear Admiral  Hon. George Heneage Lawrence Dundas (1778–1834) and Sir Robert Lawrence Dundas (1780–1844) were his younger brothers.

Dundas was educated at Harrow School and Trinity College, Cambridge (B.A. 1792; M.A. 1795). He was admitted to Lincoln's Inn in 1789 and called to the bar in 1795.

Career

In 1794, Dundas became private secretary to the Duke of Portland upon the recommendation of his own uncle Earl Fitzwilliam. 

Following the resignation of William Baldwin in 1798, Fitzwilliam successfully proposed Dundas to fill his seat for Malton. He adhered closely to his family's political stance on numerous occasions. A Foxite, he voted against the Union of Great Britain and Ireland in 1799 and 1800. In 1805, he resigned his seat to give way for the Irish Whig Henry Grattan, the well-known orator. The following year, he was returned for Richmond in Yorkshire, succeeding his younger brother George, who took up naval command again.

Personal life
Dundas married Lady Caroline Beauclerk, daughter of Aubrey Beauclerk, 5th Duke of St Albans. They had two sons and three daughters:

Ann Dundas (22 January 1800 – ), died unmarried
Frederick Dundas (14 June 1802 – 26 October 1872), MP for Orkney and Shetland,  who married Grace, daughter of Sir Ralph St George Gore, 7th Baronet
William Laurence Dundas (1 October 1803 – June 1805), died in childhood
Catherine Elizabeth (17 January 1805 – 12 February 1876), who married Lt. Gen. Freeman Murray
Charlotte Amelia (17 April 1808 – 27 January 1881), who married Ralph Thomas Fawcett 

He grew ill and died while in office, aged 40.

References  

1771 births
1810 deaths
Charles Lawrence
People educated at Harrow School
Alumni of Trinity College, Cambridge
Members of Lincoln's Inn
British MPs 1796–1800
UK MPs 1801–1802
UK MPs 1802–1806
UK MPs 1806–1807
UK MPs 1807–1812
Whig (British political party) MPs for English constituencies
Younger sons of barons
Members of the Parliament of the United Kingdom for English constituencies